Solirubrobacter soli  is a Gram-positive, non-spore-forming, rod-shaped and non-motile bacterium from the genus of Solirubrobacter which has been isolated from soil from a ginseng field in Korea.

References

External links 
Type strain of Solirubrobacter soli at BacDive –  the Bacterial Diversity Metadatabase
 

Actinomycetota
Bacteria described in 2007